Peter Madden (9 August 1904 – 24 February 1976) was a British actor who was born in Ipoh in the Federated Malay States (now Malaysia).

Birth
The son of Frederick Charles Linnet Butler-Madden and Margaret Teresa ( McCabe), Peter Madden's name at birth was Dudley Frederick Peter Butler-Madden.

Career
Madden was a character actor who made several appearances in Hammer films and was a familiar face in British film and television during the 1950s and 1960s.

He appeared as the innkeeper Bruno in The Kiss of the Vampire (1963) and as the stern Police Chief in Frankenstein Created Woman (1967). His last Hammer role was brief, as a coach driver in Frankenstein and the Monster from Hell (1973).

In the cult television series The Prisoner (1967), Madden, uncredited, plays the sinister undertaker in the opening sequence.

On television he was seen in Danger Man, Z-Cars, The Avengers, The Saint and The Champions, Out of the Unknown, Orson Welles Great Mysteries ("The Ingenious Reporter" episode), and Steptoe and Son ( episode "Live Now P.A.Y.E. Later"). He played Inspector Lestrade opposite Douglas Wilmer’s Sherlock Holmes in the 1965 BBC series.

Personal life
In 1940, he married actress Mary Jordan (1913–1973). They subsequently divorced. In 1955, he married Marion Snelling, a singer with The Mike Sammes Singers. They had a daughter, Martine (born 1956).

Death
Madden died from a ruptured aortic aneurysm at his home in Felpham in 1977.

Filmography

 Tom Brown's School Days (1940) - Jacob (uncredited)
 Rhythm Serenade (1943)
 The Wicked Lady (1945) - Hawker
 Counterblast (1948) - William Lucas, Nazi (uncredited)
 A Matter of Murder (1949) - Sgt. Bex
 A Town Like Alice (1956) - Aussie POW (uncredited)
 Fiend Without a Face (1958) - Dr. Bradley
 Battle of the V-1  (1958) - Stanislaw
 Hell Is a City (1960) - Bert Darwin
 Saturday Night and Sunday Morning (1960) - Drunken Man
 Exodus (1960) - Dr. Clement
 A Story of David (1961) - Chief Herder
 A Kind of Loving (1962) - Registrar
 The Road to Hong Kong (1962) - Lama (Slim) (uncredited)
 The Loneliness of the Long Distance Runner (1962) - Mr. Smith (uncredited)
 The Very Edge (1963) - Sergeant Williams
 80,000 Suspects (1963) - Ambulance Driver (uncredited)
 The Kiss of the Vampire (1963) - Bruno
 Stolen Hours (1963) - Reynolds
 From Russia with Love (1963) - McAdams
 Espionage (TV series) ('Do You Remember Leo Winters', episode) (1964) - Martin Davenport 
 Nothing but the Best (1964) - Ex-Politician
 Woman of Straw (1964) - Yacht Captain
 Do You Know This Voice? (1964) - Supt. Hume
 Dr. Terror's House of Horrors (1964) - Caleb (segment "Werewolf")
 He Who Rides a Tiger (1965) - Peepers Woodley
 Dr Zhivago (1965) - Political Officer
 Out of the Unknown ('Time in Advance', episode) (1965) - Examiner
 Frankenstein Created Woman (1967) - Chief of Police
 The Violent Enemy (1968) - Hewitt
 The Picasso Summer (1969) - Blind Man
 Vendetta for the Saint (1969) - Lo Zio
 The Private Life of Sherlock Holmes (1970) - Von Tirpitz
 On the Buses (1971) - Mr. Brooks
 Henry VIII and His Six Wives (1972) - Fisher
 Nearest and Dearest (1972) - Court Bailiff
 Steptoe and Son (1972, TV Series) - Norman, Retired Policeman
 Frankenstein and the Monster from Hell (1974) - Coach Driver
 Cause for Concern (1974) - Narrator (voice)
 One of Our Dinosaurs Is Missing (1975) - Sanders
 The Message (1976) - Toothless Man (final film role)

References

External links

Madden on The Dictionary of Hammer Horror

1904 births
1976 deaths
English male film actors
English male television actors
People from Ipoh
20th-century English male actors